These are notable sports leagues which are no longer operating.

Australia

Australian football
 Tasmanian Football League  (TFL, 1879–2000)
Victorian Football Association (VFA, 1877-1995)

Baseball
Australian Baseball League (1989–1999)

Rugby league
Super League (1997)
 merged with the Australian Rugby League in 1998 to form the National Rugby League
City Cup

Rugby union
Australian Rugby Championship (2007)

Soccer
National Soccer League (1977-2004)

Canada

Auto racing
 Canadian Association of Stock Car Auto Racing (CASCAR 1981–2006; replaced by the series now known as the NASCAR Pinty's Series)

Baseball
Canadian Baseball League (CBL 2003)
Provincial League (1935–1955)

Basketball
National Basketball League (Canada) (NBL 1993-94)

Ice hockey
 Coloured Hockey League (1895–1925)
 Federal Amateur Hockey League (1903–09) (professional in 1908–09)
 Eastern Canada Amateur Hockey Association (1906–09) (professional in 1908–09)
 Manitoba Professional Hockey League (MPHL 1907–09)
 National Hockey Association (NHA 1909–17)
 Canadian Hockey Association (CHA 1909–10)
 Interprovincial Professional Hockey League (IPHL 1910–11)
 Maritime Professional Hockey League (MaPHL 1911–14)
 Eastern Professional Hockey League (EPHL 1914–15)
 Pacific Coast Hockey Association (PCHA 1911–24)
 Western Canada Hockey League (WCHL 1921–26)
 International Hockey League (IHL 1945–2001)
 World Hockey Association  (WHA 1972–79) - merged with National Hockey League (NHL)
 Roller Hockey International (RHI 1993–97, 1999)

Soccer
Canadian Soccer League (CSL 1987-92)
Canadian National Soccer League (CNSL 1922-97)

New Zealand

Rugby union
 National Provincial Championship (NPC, 1976–2005; professional from 1996)
 Replaced by the current Bunnings National Provincial Championship (previously Air New Zealand Cup, ITM Cup and Mitre 10 Cup) and Heartland Championship in 2006. Although the NPC as a single entity is defunct, its basic structure was largely revived in 2011 with the split of the then-ITM Cup into two divisions. The main difference between the current NPC and its original version is that no promotion from the Heartland Championship to the Bunnings NPC is currently possible. The original NPC featured promotion and/or relegation (or at least the possibility thereof) at all three levels.

Russia

Ice hockey
 Russian Super League (1996–2008)
 Replaced by the Kontinental Hockey League in 2008. The KHL also launched with teams from Belarus, Latvia, and Kazakhstan. As of the current 2018–19 season, it includes teams in all of its original countries, as well as China, Finland, and Slovakia. At various times in its history, it has also had teams in Croatia, the Czech Republic, and Ukraine.

South Africa

Rugby union
 Vodacom Cup (1998–2015)
 Second tier of domestic professional rugby, behind the Currie Cup, although the competition occasionally included teams from Argentina and Namibia as well. Scrapped after the 2015 season; a one-off expanded Currie Cup was held in 2016 before a successor second-level competition, the Rugby Challenge, was launched in 2017.

United Kingdom

American football
 British American Football League (BAFL) (1986)

Basketball
 National Basketball League (1974–2003)

Association football
 Football Alliance (1889–1892) (replaced with the second division of the Football league)
 Athenian League (1912–1984)
 Chiltonian League (1984–2000)
 Surrey Senior League (1922–2003)

United States

Professional athletics
 International Track Association (1972-1976)

Professional baseball
 National Association of Professional Base Ball Players (1871–75)
 American Association I (1882–1891)
 Union Association (1884)
 Negro leagues
 League of Colored Baseball Clubs (1887), minor league
 Negro National League (I) (1920–1931)
 Eastern Colored League (1923–1928)
 American Negro League (1929)
 East-West League (1932)
 Negro Southern League (1932), minor league 1920–1931 and 1933–1940s
 Negro National League (II) (1933–1948)
 Negro American League (1937–1950), minor league 1951–1960
 West Coast Negro Baseball League (1946), minor league
 Players' League (1890)
 Atlantic League (1896–1900)
 Union Professional League (1908)
 Federal League (1914–1915)
 American Association II minor league (1902–1962 and 1969–1997)
 All-American Girls Professional Baseball League (1943–1954)
 Blue Ridge League (1915–1918, 1919–1930, 1946–1950)
 Continental League (1960, never played)
 Senior Professional Baseball Association (1989–1990)
 Great Central League (1994)
 Western Baseball League (1995–2002)
 Canadian American Association of Professional Baseball (2005–2019)
 Carolina League I (1936-1938)
 Eastern League I (1884-1887)
 Eastern League II (1916-1932)
 New York–Penn League (1939–2020)
 Southern League I (1885-1899)
 South Atlantic League I (1904-1917, 1919-1930, 1936-1942 and 1946-1962)

Professional basketball
Men:
 AABA-All-American Basketball Alliance (1977–78)
 AAPBL-All-American Professional Basketball League (2005)
 ABA-American Basketball Association (1967–1976) - merged with the National Basketball Association (NBA)
 ABL I-American Basketball League I (1925–1955)
 ABL II-American Basketball League II (1961–1963)
 GBA-Global Basketball Association (1991–92, league folded midway through 1992-93 season)
 IBA-International Basketball Association (1995–2001)
 IBL-International Basketball League (1999–2001)
 NBL-National Basketball League (1937–1949)
 NPBL-National Professional Basketball League (1950–1951)
 NRL-National Rookie League (2000–2002)
 PBLA-Professional Basketball League of America (1947–1948)
 WBA-Western Basketball Association (1978–79)
 WBL-World Basketball League (1988–1992)
 CBA-Continental Basketball Association (1946–2009)
 USBL-United States Basketball League (1985-2008)

Women:
 WBL-Women's Pro Basketball League (1978–81)
 ABL-American Basketball League III (1996–1998)
WABA-Women's American Basketball Association (1993–1995) (2002)

Amateur basketball
 Amateur Athletic Association Basketball (AAU 1897–1982)

Professional football
AAF – Alliance of American Football (2019)
AAFC – All-America Football Conference (1946–1949)
AFL – American Football League (1926)
AFL – American Football League (1936–1937)
AFL – American Football League (1940–1941)
AFL – American Football League (1960–1969, now the American Football Conference of the major league NFL)
AFL – Arena Football League (1987–2008)
 The AFL returned in 2010, but is a separate legal entity from the original AFL. The current league purchased the assets of the original AFL in a bankruptcy auction, enabling it to brand itself as the first league's successor.
af2 (2000–2009), the Arena Football League's official minor league
 Many of the teams in the revived AFL are former af2 teams. In fact, the original lineup of Arena Football 1, the league that morphed into the revived AFL, included more af2 teams than former AFL teams.
CFL – Continental Football League (1965–1969)
FXFL – Fall Experimental Football League (2014–2015)
IFL – Indoor Football League (1999–2000)
IPFL – Indoor Professional Football League (1999–2001)
PIFL – Professional Indoor Football League (1998)
PSFL – Professional Spring Football League (1991 – Training Camp)
UFL – United Football League (2009–2012)
USFL – United States Football League (1983–1985; not to be confused with the current USFL)
WFL – World Football League (1974–1975)
 XFL (2001) - Xtreme Football League

Professional hockey
 World Hockey Association  (WHA 1972–1979) - merged with National Hockey League (NHL)
 Pacific Coast Hockey Association (PCHA 1911–1924)
 International Hockey League (IHL 1945–2001)
 Roller Hockey International (RHI 1993–1997, 1999)
 Global Hockey League (Did not play, 1990)

Professional rugby union
 PRO Rugby 2016 (succeeded by Major League Rugby 2018 to present)

Professional soccer (association football)
 A-League (1995–2004; succeeded by USL First Division)
 American Football Association (1896–1907)
 American Professional Soccer League (1990–1994; operated as A-League in 1995–1996)
 American Soccer League  (1921–1933, 1933–1983, 1988–1989)
 Continental Indoor Soccer League (CISL 1993-97)
 Major Soccer League aka Major Indoor Soccer League  (1978–1992)
 Major Indoor Soccer League (MISL 2001–2008)
 North American Soccer League  (NASL 1968–1984)
 United Soccer League (1984–85)
 USL First Division (formally 2005–2010, last competitive season was 2009; folded into USL Pro for 2011, USL Pro renamed United Soccer League in 2015 and USL Championship from 2019)
 USL Second Division (1990–2010; folded into USL Pro)
 USSF Division 2 Professional League (2010 only; compromise between the feuding USL and new NASL)
 Women's Professional Soccer (WPS, 2009–2011; effectively revived in 2013 as the National Women's Soccer League)
 Women's United Soccer Association (WUSA, 2001–2003; effective predecessor to WPS)
 World Indoor Soccer League (WISL 1998–2001)
 Xtreme Soccer League (XSL 2008-09)

Professional Softball
 National Pro Fastpitch (2004–2021)

Professional lacrosse
 National Lacrosse League (1974-75)
 American Lacrosse League (1988)
 Major League Lacrosse (2001–2020) — merged with the Premier Lacrosse League, with the merged league operating under the PLL name

Other
 ANZ Championship (joint Australia–New Zealand women's netball league, 2008–2016)
 BeNe League (joint Belgian–Dutch women's football league, 2012–2015)
 bj League (Basketball Japan League) (2005-2016)
 Champions Tennis League (India) (2014-2015)
 China Arena Football League (founded 2012, existed between 2016 & 2019)
 China Baseball League (2002-2018)
 Chinese Basketball Alliance (Chinese Taipei) (1995-1999)
 Chinese Jia-A League (China) (Association Football) (1994-2003)
 DBL – Dutch Basketball League (Netherlands, 1960–2021, though not professional until the 1990s); merged with the Belgian Pro Basketball League to establish the current BNXT League
 Galatama (Indonesia) (Association Football) (1979-1994)
 Garena Premier League (eSports) (2012-2018)
 Intercity Football League (Chinese Taipei) (2007-2016)
 League of Legends SEA Tour (eSports) (2018-2019)
 League of Legends Master Series (eSports) (Taiwan/Hong Kong/Macau) (2015-2019)
 Liga Primer Indonesia (Association Football) (2011)
 Indonesia Premier League (Association Football) (2011-2013)
 Indonesia Soccer Championship (2016)
 International Premier Tennis League (2014-2016)
 International Volleyball Association (IVA 1975-1980)
 JBL Super League (Japan) (Basketball) (2001-2007)
 Japan Basketball League (2007-2013)
 Japan Football League (1992-1998)
 Japan Soccer League (JSL 1965–1992)
 Japan Company Rugby Football Championship (Rugby Union) (1948-2003)
 Korea National League (South Korea) (Association Football) (2003-2019)
 Korean National Semi-Professional Football League (South Korea) (1964-2002)
 Top Challenge League (Japan) (Rugby Union) (2004-2021)
 Championship Gaming Series (CGS 2007-08)
 Liga Semi-Pro (Malaysia) (Association Football) (1989-1993)
 Liga Perdana (Malaysia) (Association Football) (1994-1997)
 Liga Perdana 1 (Malaysia) (Association Football) (1998-2003)
 Liga Perdana 2 (Malaysia) (Association Football) (1998-2003)
 Major League Ultimate  (2013–16)
 Major League Volleyball (1987–89)
 Malaysia National Basketball League (1981-2013)
 Malaysia Premier League (Association Football) (2004-2022)
 Malaysia Pro League (Basketball) (2017-2019)
 Metropolitan Basketball Association (Philippines) (1998-2002)
 National Basketball League (Japan) (2013-2016)
 National Bowling League (NBL 1961-62)
 World League of American Football  / NFL Europe (1991–2007)
 Philippine Premier League (Association Football) (2019)
 Philippine Super Liga (Volleyball) (2013-2021)
 PBL – Pro Basketball League (Belgium, 1928–2021, though not professional until the 1990s); merged with the Dutch Basketball League to establish the current BNXT League 
 Premier Futsal (India) (2016-2017)
 Premier Hockey League (India) (Field Hockey) (2005-08)
 Pro Cricket (2004)
 Pro Wrestling League (India) (Wrestling) (2015-19)
 PRO Rugby (US rugby union league, 2016)
 Professional Slow Pitch Softball Leagues  (1977–82)
 UBA Pro Basketball League (India) (2015-2017)
 UCypher (India) (eSports) (2018)
 Women's American football leagues since 2004
 Women's Western Volleyball League (WWVL 1993-94)

References

External links
 North American Pro Sports Teams- Lists every imaginable league that has operated in Canada and / or the United States.  Grouped by city.

Leagues